Daniel Forsell (born 4 January 1982) is a Swedish footballer who plays as a defender.

References

External links

1982 births
Living people
Association football defenders
BK Häcken players
Allsvenskan players
Superettan players
Swedish footballers
Utsiktens BK players